The 2018 Faroe Islands Cup was the 64th edition of Faroe Islands domestic football cup. The competition started on 25 April and ended with the final on 25 August. NSÍ were the defending champions, having won their third cup title the previous year, but were upset in the first round by eventual semifinalists AB, becoming the first defending champion since 1992 to be knocked out in the first stage.

B36 won the cup for the 6th time and qualified for the Preliminary round of the 2019–20 UEFA Europa League.

Only the first teams of Faroese football clubs were allowed to participate. Teams from all divisions entered the competition in the first round. MB withdrew the competition. As a result, one team would advance directly to the quarterfinals.

Participating clubs

TH – Title Holders

Round and draw dates

First round
Entering this round are all ten clubs from Betri deildin menn, four from 1. deild, and one from 2. deild.

|}

Quarter-finals

|}

Semi-finals

|}

Final

Top goalscorers

References

External links
 Cup in Faroe Soccer

Faroe Islands Cup seasons
Cup
Faroe Islands Cup